Brad Scott born (15 June 1977, Wanganui, New Zealand) is a former New Zealand soccer player, who played 2 full internationals and represented the U23 NZ side 17 times.

Scott played for Floreat Athena in the Football West State League (2009/2010 season) where he won player of the year and won the golden boot for the club in (2009) and was a part of the Night Series winning team in 2010.  Scott was picked in the Football West - WA side in 2009 which played against SA.

Scott had playing stints in Hong Kong and Indonesia where he represented clubs Happy Valley (2006/7) and Sriwijaya FC (2005/6).

During the 2005 Northern League season, Scott
scored 17 goals for North Shore United and finished as the top scorer in the league.  He won the same title in the 2004 Northern League where he scored 23 goals for North Shore United.

In the National Soccer League in Australia played two seasons.  One for the Football Kingz (2003/4 season) and another for the Canberra Cosmos (2000/01).

Scott made two A-international appearances for New Zealand in 2000, scoring 1 goal on his debut against Malaysia.

References 

1977 births
Living people
New Zealand international footballers
New Zealand association footballers
Sportspeople from Whanganui
Association football forwards